Jigawa Golden Stars Football Club is a Nigerian football club. They play in the second level of professional football in Nigeria, the Nigeria National League. Until 2007 they played in the city of Kano. After promotion, the team then moved to play its home games in Zaria, Kaduna State because of interference from Kano officials and their ground in Dutse being under renovation until March 2008.

Current squad

References

External links
 Jigawa Stars sack chief coach, 20 players
 Jigawa Stars need N50m
 Jigawa FA hails birth of Gadawur FC/Jigawa Stars place 27 players on transfer
 Jigawa supporters make case for Stars FC

Football clubs in Nigeria
Jigawa State
Sports clubs in Nigeria